The A3054 is an A-Class Road on the Isle of Wight in Southern England.  It forms the Northern half of the circular around-the-Island A-class loop, the southern half being the A3055.  It connects Newport and Ryde, the two largest towns on the Island, as well as continuing to West Wight.

Because of the road's relatively short length, there are no confirmatory signs with distances, although on a few direction signs at junctions there are distances to the next town.  The final destination of the road (Freshwater/Totland or Ryde), in common with most UK roads, is not always signed along the whole length of the route.

External links
Isle of Wight Council – the local authority who maintain the road

Roads in England
Transport on the Isle of Wight